Bruster's Ice Cream, Inc., also known as Bruster's Real Ice Cream or Bruster's, is an American chain of ice cream parlors based in Bridgewater, Pennsylvania.  Their primary operating region is in most states east of the Mississippi River. 
The company's main products are ice cream and frozen yogurt, made on site with a milk-based mix at each individual store and made fresh in order to avoid ice crystal formation. There are 200 independently owned locations in 22 states, Guyana and South Korea.

History 

Bruce Reed got his start with the ice cream business in the 1950s, when, as a child, he helped out his parents at their diner, Jerry's Curb Service, in Bridgewater, Pennsylvania, a small town located 27 miles northwest of Pittsburgh. It was through this experience that Reed would learn from his dad the secrets to the restaurant business.

In 1989, Reed opened an ice-cream shop right next door to Jerry's. Then Reed began operating under the Bruster's name after 15 months in the business.

Bruster's also began franchising and has outlets in Alabama, Arizona, California, Connecticut, Delaware, Florida, Georgia, Indiana, Kentucky, Maryland, Mississippi, New Hampshire, New Jersey, New York, North Carolina, Ohio, Pennsylvania, South Carolina, Tennessee, Texas, Utah, Virginia, Guyana, and recently in South Korea as well. Bruster's remains headquartered in Bridgewater.

Co-branding

Some Bruster's locations also operate as franchisees of Nathan's Famous, with Nathan's hot dogs and other menu items sold in addition to ice cream.

Products
The recipe book that Bruster's uses consists of over 170 recipes. Bruster's also makes handmade ice cream cakes, homemade waffle cones, milkshakes, sundaes, and banana splits. Bruster's has recently introduced a limited range of non-dairy ice cream flavors made with oat milk.

References

External links

Privately held companies based in Pennsylvania
Fast-food chains of the United States
Fast-food franchises
Ice cream parlors
Regional restaurant chains in the United States
Restaurants established in 1989
American companies established in 1989
1990 establishments in Pennsylvania
Beaver County, Pennsylvania